Mathew Tyler Oakley (born March 22, 1989) is an American YouTuber, actor, activist, author and Twitch streamer. Much of Oakley's activism has been dedicated to LGBT youth, LGBT rights, as well as social issues including health care, education, and the prevention of suicide among LGBT youth. Oakley regularly posts material on various topics, including pop culture and humor.

Since uploading his first video in 2007 while a freshman at Michigan State University, his channel has over 683 million views, and, at his peak, over 8 million subscribers.  Oakley, who is openly gay, is a former member of the successful collaboration channel "5AwesomeGays", where he produced the Friday video for over three years. He was featured in the 2014 Frontline investigative report "Generation Like", a follow-up on how teenagers are "directly interacting with pop culture" to the 2001 report, "The Merchants of Cool". SocialBlade, a website that rates YouTube and Instagram accounts, ranks his YouTube channel, with a grade "B", subscriber rank of 1,434th, video view rank at 7,022nd, and a SocialBlade rating of 345,254th.  he also had more than 5.6 million followers on Twitter and 5.6 million on Instagram.

From March to October 2013, Oakley co-hosted a weekly pop-culture news update – "Top That!" – with Becca Frucht for PopSugar. From 2013 to 2014, he performed the voice of Mr. McNeely in five episodes of the comedy web series The Most Popular Girls in School. He has hundreds of thousands of followers on  Facebook and Tumblr.  In 2015, he released his first collection of humorous personal essays under the title Binge, via publishers Simon & Schuster.

Oakley was the host of The Tyler Oakley Show, which aired weekly on Ellen DeGeneres' ellentube platform. In 2017,  he was named in Forbes "30 Under 30".

Early life 
Mathew Tyler Oakley was born on March 22, 1989, in Jackson, Michigan. He has twelve siblings. When he was an infant, his parents divorced. When in the sixth grade, Oakley moved to Okemos, and became involved in choir and drama. As a teenager, he had bulimia nervosa.

Oakley graduated with a Bachelor of Arts in communication, marketing and social media from Michigan State University. While at college, he fell into a short depression after a breakup with a long-term boyfriend. Oakley admits he considered suicide in this time. His college years were also when he first became involved with YouTube, using the video sharing website to communicate with his high school friends, who were attending different schools.

Career

Social media

Oakley is an active member across many social media platforms. A self-proclaimed "professional fangirl", he is a fan of Darren Criss from Glee, along with Julie Chen of CBS's daytime talk show The Talk. He also sang Christmas carols on stage with English-Irish boy band One Direction and television presenter Jerry Springer.

Oakley is known for receiving attention from major celebrities and organizations, such as Liam Payne from One Direction, Chris Colfer from the television series Glee and the restaurant chain store Taco Bell, namely on social network Twitter after commenting on a previous tweet of theirs or tweeting about them. Due to Oakley's success with social media and prominence among many social media platforms (particularly YouTube), he was given the opportunity to meet U.S. President Barack Obama at the White House. He did a video with First Lady Michelle Obama talking about education issues.

Oakley attributes his success only in part to his accessibility as a young gay man. "It's not all about me being gay. It's kind of like an underlying theme for me [with gay life] sprinkled throughout the videos." He sees Ellen DeGeneres as a role model: "She embodies what I want my experience to be and my influence to be, where it's a positive one, it's a happy one, it's not something about the bad parts of life or the downsides of a lot of things. She's using her influence for good, and everyone knows who she is, what she stands for, and that she is a lesbian."

The Advocate in their 2014 "40 under 40: Emerging voices" say that, due to Oakley's presence on YouTube, he is the first openly gay person that many people have met. Oakley is considered one of the world's leading Celebrity influencers, having an Influencer Score of 99 from the influencer marketing software Klear.

In December 2020, Oakley announced he was taking an indefinite hiatus from making Youtube videos.

Acting 
Oakley appeared on the YouTube Red (now YouTube Premium) show Escape the Night with Joey Graceffa, appearing as "The Thespian" for 10 episodes (Season 2).

Live appearances 
In 2014, Oakley premiered a live show tour, "Tyler Oakley's Slumber Party", featuring him in pajamas and doing skits, and interactive segments with the audience. His two initial shows in Chicago and in Royal Oak, Michigan in early October both sold out in 72 hours. In December 2014, seven dates, all on the East Coast, made up the next leg of the tour, which was expected to eventually go to 40 cities. Variety noted that the trend of "digital-native stars hitting the road for 'in-real-life' shows" had been increasing. Oakley had been a part of DigiTour's 2014 US Summer tour of YouTube and Vine personalities.

Podcast 
Oakley has a podcast called Psychobabble with his best friend, Korey Kuhl. It launched in 2014 and as of 2022 has had over 350 episodes.

Television 
On screen, Oakley has done appearances on broadcasting platforms, with some airing on national TV. He was seen on Insider Tonight, featuring co-hosts Kevin Frazier and Thea Andrews. He has interviewed live from the 2014 Kids Choice Awards red carpet, along with many other events that have him meeting and speaking to celebrities.

Oakley, alongside best friend Korey Kuhl, competed in the 28th season of The Amazing Race, which aired in 2016. They finished in 3rd place. The two also participated in the 31st season of the show, which began airing on April 17, 2019. They finished in 2nd place.

In 2018, Oakley also appeared on the tenth episode of the tenth season of RuPaul's Drag Race, where he was paired with Monét X Change for a makeover challenge.

Volunteering and charity 
Oakley supports The Trevor Project, an organization for the prevention of suicide among LGBT youth. He interned with them in 2009, and since 2011 has co-hosted TrevorLIVE, the charity's annual red carpet event. In 2013 he raised $29,000 for his birthday in support of the Trevor Project having aimed to raise $24,000 (because it was his 24th birthday). In 2014, he raised $525,704 in a similar event, and in 2015 he raised $532,224.

Bibliography

 Binge (2015)

Awards and nominations

See also

 List of YouTubers

References

External links

 
 Tyler Oakley's official Wattpad profile

1989 births
21st-century American male actors
21st-century American male writers
21st-century American non-fiction writers
American bloggers
American male bloggers
American male non-fiction writers
American podcasters
American YouTubers
Big Frame people
American gay actors
Gay entertainers
American gay writers
LGBT YouTubers
Gay memoirists
LGBT people from Michigan
American LGBT rights activists
Living people
Male actors from Michigan
Michigan State University alumni
People from Jackson, Michigan
People from Okemos, Michigan
Streamy Award winners
The Amazing Race (American TV series) contestants
Twitch (service) streamers
Video bloggers
Writers from Michigan
YouTube channels launched in 2007
20th-century LGBT people
21st-century LGBT people
YouTubers who make LGBT-related content